Roscommon County–Blodgett Memorial Airport  is a county-owned public-use airport located five miles (8 km) northeast of the central business district of Houghton Lake, an unincorporated community in Roscommon County, Michigan, United States. It is included in the Federal Aviation Administration (FAA) National Plan of Integrated Airport Systems for 2017–2021, in which it is categorized as a local general aviation facility.

It was known as Roscommon County Airport until 2005, when it was named to honor Terry Blodgett, the airport's manager from 1987 until his death in 2004, and his father Francis Blodgett, airport manager from 1959 to 1981.

The airport is home to a chapter of the Experimental Aircraft Association, which hosts regular events such as Easter Egg Drops and fly-in breakfasts with model planes, the opportunity to interact with personal planes, and free flights. The airport is also home to regular veteran's appreciation events, where veterans are welcome to enjoy warm drinks and refreshments.

Facilities and aircraft 

The airport has a fixed-base operator that sells fuel and offers a lounge, rest rooms, and other amenities.

For the 12-month period ending December 31, 2006, the airport had 12,775 aircraft operations, all general aviation, an average of 35 per day. There are 17 aircraft based on the field, all single-engine airplanes.

The airport is staffed daily from 8:00 a.m. until 5:30 p.m. It is accessible by road from County Road 100, and is close to M-18, M-157, and U.S. Highway 127.

Accidents and incidents
On April 14, 2016, an aircraft made an emergency landing at Blodgett Memorial Airport after a goose impacted and broke the airplane's windshield. The bird flew all the way into the aircraft's baggage compartment, and the pilot flew for 20 minutes before making a safe landing.

References

External links 
  

Airports in Michigan
Buildings and structures in Roscommon County, Michigan
Transportation in Roscommon County, Michigan